Adolf Bergman (14 April 1879 – 14 May 1926) was a Swedish policeman and tug of war competitor who won a gold medal at the 1912 Summer Olympics.

References

1879 births
1926 deaths
Tug of war competitors at the 1912 Summer Olympics
Olympic tug of war competitors of Sweden
Olympic gold medalists for Sweden
Olympic medalists in tug of war
Medalists at the 1912 Summer Olympics